Pekin duck may refer to: 

 American Pekin, an American breed of duck (the Pekin of the American Poultry Association)
 German Pekin, a European breed of duck (the Pekin of the Poultry Club of Great Britain)
 Peking duck, a Chinese duck dish
 Peking Duk, an Australian music duo

See also
 Beijing Ducks, a Chinese basketball team
 Peking (disambiguation)
 Pekin (disambiguation)
 Duck (disambiguation)